The Marcos LM600 is a purpose-built grand tourer-style sports race car, designed, developed and built by British manufacturer Marcos Engineering, specifically for the rules and regulations of the FIA GT2 class, and competed in the British GT Championship, BPR Global GT Series, and the FIA GT Championship, between 1995 and 1997.

References

Grand tourer racing cars